The Blue Gate of Babylon is the third comic novel by British writer Paul Pickering. It was published by Chatto & Windus and Penguin Books in the United Kingdom and Random House in the United States, was long-listed for the Booker Prize, became a New York Times notable book of the year and saw Pickering included in the Top Ten Young British Novelists. The novel received favourable reviews on both sides of the Atlantic.

Notes

External links
Debrett's People of Today 21 August 2005
Collected reviews
Paul Pickering at Simon & Schuster USA.
Paul Pickering at Simon & Schuster UK.
Paul Pickering's website

1989 British novels
Novels by Paul Pickering
Chatto & Windus books